The Joan Baez Country Music Album is a 1979 compilation album by Joan Baez.

Track listing
"The Night They Drove Old Dixie Down" (J. R. Robertson)
"Brand New Tennessee Waltz" (J. Winchester)
"Outside The Nashville City Limits" (J. Baez)
"Ghetto" (H. Banks, B. Bramlett, B. Crutcher)
"My Home's Across The Blue Ridge Mountains" (T. Ashley)
"Rock Salt and Nails" (B. Phillips)
"Help Me Make It Through the Night" (K. Kristofferson)
"Long Black Veil" (D. Dill, M. Wilkin)
"I Still Miss Someone" (J. Cash, R. Cash Jr.)
"San Francisco Mabel Joy" (M. Newbury)
"Take Me Back to the Sweet Sunny South" (traditional)
"Hickory Wind" (B. Bucannan, G. Parsons)
"Will the Circle Be Unbroken" (traditional)
"The Tramp on the Street" (G. Cole, H. Cole, J. Baez, M. Solomon)
"Carry It On" (G. Turner)
"Gospel Ship" (H. Buffam)
"Little Moses" (traditional)
"Banks of the Ohio" (traditional)
"Engine 143" (traditional)
"Pal of Mine" (traditional)

References

Joan Baez compilation albums
1979 compilation albums
Albums produced by Maynard Solomon
Albums produced by Norbert Putnam
Vanguard Records compilation albums